Clastoptera proteus, the dogwood spittlebug, is a species of spittlebug in the family Clastopteridae. It is found in North America.

Subspecies
These 10 subspecies belong to the species Clastoptera proteus:
 Clastoptera proteus anceps McAtee
 Clastoptera proteus candens McAtee
 Clastoptera proteus flava Ball
 Clastoptera proteus hyperici McAtee
 Clastoptera proteus nigra Ball
 Clastoptera proteus nigricollis Fitch
 Clastoptera proteus osceola Ball
 Clastoptera proteus proteus
 Clastoptera proteus seminuda Ball
 Clastoptera proteus vittata Ball

References

External links

 

Articles created by Qbugbot
Insects described in 1851
Clastopteridae